Dominika Kopińska (born 11 October 1999) is a Polish footballer who plays as a midfielder and has appeared for the Poland women's national team and UKS SMS Łódź.

Career
Kopińska has been capped for the Poland national team, appearing for the team during the 2019 FIFA Women's World Cup qualifying cycle.

References

External links
 
 
 

1999 births
Living people
Polish women's footballers
Poland women's international footballers
Women's association football midfielders
Medyk Konin players